Mark Mitchell (born 29 September 1954) is an Australian actor, comedian and contemporary artist, best known for his character Con the Fruiterer.

Early life
Mark Mitchell was born in Melbourne.  He studied English and graduated with a Bachelor of Arts from the University of Melbourne and then completed a Diploma of Education at State College of Victoria Rusden Campus (now part of Deakin University).  He taught secondary school (Ararat high school) English for five years before becoming an advertising copy-writer and then a professional actor.

Career
Mitchell starred in the pioneering sketch comedy show The Eleventh Hour, a predecessor to his hit sketch show The Comedy Company. His best known character is Con Dickaletus aka 'Con the Fruiterer' whom he created after being served by two Greek Australian stall holders at Glenferrie Markets in 1984. The character became known nationally from regular appearances in The Comedy Company, for which he also created the character of Con's wife, Marika.

He has made many guest appearances on Australian television series such as SeaChange, Neighbours, Something in the Air, Blue Heelers, Prisoner, Dogwoman and Upper Middle Bogan.

He has also starred in children's television programs such as Round the Twist, Lift Off and The Genie From Down Under. He played the part of Chief Quimby in the 2003 film Inspector Gadget 2. He has also lent his voice to the children's animated series Li'l Elvis Jones and the Truckstoppers and  The Flamin' Thongs.

Mitchell voices commercial radio advertising campaigns, playing a dim-witted fool who interviews various people about radio advertising, with amusing consequences resulting from his character's lack of understanding the interviewees.

He also portrayed fictional museum exhibit figure "Max Muck" for some of the video reel and photos used and depicted in the exhibit "The Muck Bunker Constipation Experience" at Scienceworks Museum in Melbourne housed in the Spotswood Pumping Station.

He has had supporting lead roles in various US movies made in Australia including The Munsters' Scary Little Christmas and The Strange Case of Sharte Keams, and voiced the character of 'Buck Cluck' for the Australian release of Chicken Little. He has also portrayed David Lange in the 1994 New Zealand video game mini-series Fallout.

References

External links
Mark Mitchell Profile
 

Living people
1954 births
Australian male film actors
Australian male soap opera actors
Comedians from Melbourne
Male actors from Melbourne
20th-century Australian male actors
21st-century Australian male actors